The Carp River is a  stream in the northeast corner of Luce County on the Upper Peninsula of Michigan in the United States. It flows west from the outlet of Browns Lake, to its mouth on Lake Superior.

See also
List of rivers of Michigan

References

Michigan  Streamflow Data from the USGS

Rivers of Michigan
Rivers of Luce County, Michigan
Tributaries of Lake Superior